Senator McCarter may refer to:

Kyle McCarter (born 1962), Illinois State Senate
Thomas N. McCarter (1867–1955), New Jersey State Senate